Dorothy Fane (1889–1976), nee Foster, was a British actress. She is sometimes credited as Dorothy Fayne. Fane appeared frequently in the British theatre and silent films.

Selected filmography

Dorothy Foster
 Hamlet (1912)
 The Gentleman Ranker (1912)
 The Fishergirl of Cornwall (1912)
 A Cornish Romance (1912)
 Lieutenant Daring and the Labour Riots (1913)

Dorothy Fane
 The Picture of Dorian Gray (1916)
 The Bigamist (1916)
 The Flag Lieutenant (1919)
 The Pride of the Fancy (1920) - Hilda Douglas
 In the Night (1920) - Estelle
 Daniel Deronda (1921) - Gwendolen Harleith
 Corinthian Jack (1921) - Lady Barbara
 The Harper's Mystery (1921)
 Married Life (1921)
 The Princess of New York (1921)-  Violet Meretham
 Laughter and Tears (1921) - Countess Maltakoff
 The Bonnie Brier Bush (1921) - Kate Carnegie
 The Lonely Lady of Grosvenor Square (1922) - Anne-Marie Marney
 Bulldog Drummond (1922)
 Creation (1922)
 A Lost Leader (1922)
 The Loves of Mary, Queen of Scots (1923) - Mary Beaton
 Lights of London (1923) - Belle
 The Vortex (1928) - Helen Saville
Threads (1932)
 The Innocents of Chicago (1932)

References

Bibliography
 Kear, Lynn & King, James. Evelyn Brent: The Life and Films of Hollywood's Lady Crook. McFarland & Co, 2009.

External links

1889 births
1976 deaths
British film actresses
British stage actresses
20th-century British actresses